Newbury College may refer to:

Newbury College (England), a further education college in England
Newbury College (United States), a career-focused college in Brookline, Massachusetts

See also
Newberry College, South Carolina